Friends is an American children-oriented comedy-drama series that aired on ABC from March 25 to April 22, 1979. The series, which was produced by Aaron Spelling, starred Charlie Aiken, Jill Whelan, Janet MacLachlan, Jarrod Johnson, Karen Morrow and Roger Robinson.

Five one-hour episodes were produced before the series was cancelled.

Overview
A comedy-drama series as seen through the eyes of three 11-year-old children from different backgrounds with episodes focusing upon the trials and tribulations of adolescence, and involved subjects such as dating, family, school, growing pains and friendship.

Cast
Charlie Aiken as Pete Richards
Jarrod Johnson as Randy Summerfield
Janet MacLachlan as Jane Summerfield
Karen Morrow as Pamela Richards
Roger Robinson as Warren Summerfield
Andy Romano as Frank Richards
Jill Whelan as Nancy Wilks

Episodes

References
Brooks, Tim; Marsh, Earle. The Complete Directory to Prime Time Network and Cable TV Shows 1946–Present. Eight Edition. New York: Ballantine, 2003.

External links

1979 American television series debuts
1979 American television series endings
1970s American comedy-drama television series
1970s American children's comedy television series
American Broadcasting Company original programming
Television series about children
Television series about families
Television series by Spelling Television
Television series by CBS Studios